Tom Whited Dutton (March 22, 1893 – December 1, 1969) was an American college football player.

Early years
He attended Minden High School but did not play on the school's football team.

LSU
Dutton was a prominent guard for the LSU Tigers of Louisiana State University. He was thrice selected All-Southern.  James Dwyer showed him the sport, and even used Dutton for a "kangaroo play" in which back Lawrence Dupont would crawl between Dutton's legs; supposedly very effective in short yardage situations.

Dutton was later a key member of the university's Board of Supervisors, which hired and fired football coaches, and president of LSU Alumni. He is a member of both the Louisiana Sports Hall of Fame and Louisiana State University Athletic Hall of Fame. He was nominated, though not selected, for an Associated Press All-Time Southeast 1869–1919 era team.

1913
Dutton was captain in 1913.

1919
Although he graduated in 1914, rules in effect at the time allowed Dutton one more year of eligibility and he returned in 1919 for post-graduate work and a final football season. He was again captain of the team; coached by Irving Pray.

Personal life
He married Thelma Opdenweyer at Prairieville, Louisiana on May 8, 1917.

References

American football guards
LSU Tigers football players
All-Southern college football players
1893 births
1969 deaths
Players of American football from Louisiana
People from Arcadia, Louisiana
Minden High School (Minden, Louisiana) alumni